Osieczna  is a village in Starogard County, Pomeranian Voivodeship, in northern Poland. It is the seat of the gmina (administrative district) called Gmina Osieczna. It is located in the historic region of Pomerania.

History
During the German occupation of Poland (World War II), Osieczna was one of the sites of executions of Poles, carried out by the Germans in 1939 as part of the Intelligenzaktion.

References

Osieczna